MasterChef Selebriti Malaysia (in English: Celebrity MasterChef Malaysia) is a Malaysian competitive cooking game show. It is the spin-off of MasterChef Malaysia, itself an adaptation of the British show MasterChef, and which features a celebrity contestants casting. Its production began in May 2012 and premiered on Astro Ria and Mustika HD on 25 May 2012.

Format
MasterChef Malaysia has a different format in each episode. A typical episode format is as follows:

1. Saturday - Peti Saji Misteri & Ujian Cipta Rasa. Each participant is given a box containing ingredients to cook the same and need to prepare a meal using ingredients given alone. This dish will be felt by Chef MCM, and a winner will be selected. Peti Saji Misteri winner will be given the opportunity to choose the main course of the Ujian Cipta Rasa. Participants must create a dish using the selected main dish.

2. Sundays - Ujian Sajian Pantas & Penyingkiran. Three participants who are unable to satisfy Chef MCM from the night before the challenge will be a recipe for a particular dish. They need to produce the same dish in the allotted time. Participants who make poor meal would be eliminated from the competition.

3. Monday - Cabaran Sajian Luar. The participants will be divided into teams consisting of the same number and was given the task and time frame to complete this challenge. The task is like cooking for the black tie or military camps. The losing team will face relegation next night.

4. Tuesday - Ujian Sajian Pantas & Penyingkiran. Participants who are unable to satisfy Chef MCM from the night before the challenge will be a recipe for a particular dish. They need to produce the same dish in the allotted time. Participants who make poor meal would be eliminated from the competition.

They will have to overcome pressure tests, creative challenges and elimination tests, under the eye of a very demanding jury, composed of the well-known chefs Moh Johari Edrus (Chef Papa Jo), Zubir Md. Zain (Chef Zubir) and Adu Amran Hassan (Chef Adu).

Series 1 (2012)

Contestants 
Celebrity MasterChef Malaysia Season 1 featured 16 celebrity contestants:

Elimination table 

 (WINNER) This chef won the competition.
 (RUNNER-UP) This chef received second place.
 (WIN) The chef won the individual challenge (Mystery Box Challenge or Invention Test) and received an advantage in the next challenge.
 (WIN) The chef was on the winning team in the Team Challenge and was safe from the Elimination Test.
 (HIGH) The chef was one of the top entries in the individual challenge, but did not win.
 (IN) The chef was not selected as a top entry or bottom entry in the challenge.
 (TM) The chef was on the blue team in the Team Challenge
 (TM) The chef was on the red team in the Team Challenge
 (TM) The chef was on the yellow team in the Team Challenge
 (TM) The chef was on the green team in the Team Challenge
 (IMM) The chef won the Mystery Box Challenge and did not have to compete in the Invention Test.
 (ET) The chef was on the losing team in the Team Challenge or the chef was one of the bottom entries in an individual challenge (Invention Test), competed in the Elimination Test, and advanced.
 (ET2) The chef competed in second elimination test after first elimination test, and advanced.
 (NET) The chef was on the losing team in the Team Challenge, but did not compete in the elimination test, and advanced.
 (LOW) The chef was one of the bottom entries in an individual challenge (Invention Test)
 (SAV) The chef was Saved from eliminated (Non-elimination Round)
 (ELIM) The chef was eliminated from the competition.

Series 2 (2013)

Contestants 
Season 2 featured 19 celebrity contestants:

Elimination chart 

 On episode 4, Syanie, Aznil, Afiq, Che Ta and Keroz willingly to be in the bottom 5 and go through elimination process without being selected by Celina after their team lose. 
 On episode 8, red team lose and the result of elimination round for performance that week were not revealed and then later it was revealed Saathiya Ramasamy was eliminated.

External links
 http://www.astro.com.my/masterchefv2/indices/index_1570.html 
 MASTERCHEF SELEBRITI MALAYSIA FACEBOOK

Malaysia Celebrity
2012 Malaysian television series debuts
Masterchef
Reality television spin-offs
Non-British television series based on British television series
Astro Ria original programming